Grantsboro is a town in Pamlico County, North Carolina, United States. It was incorporated in 1997 and is located at the intersection of North Carolina Highways 55 and 306. The town is part of the New Bern, North Carolina Metropolitan Statistical Area.

Demographics

2020 census

As of the 2020 United States census, there were 692 people, 247 households, and 177 families residing in the town.

2010 census
Grantsboro had a population of 688 in 2010.

References

Pamlico Ink – Newspaper of the Pamlico Sound

Towns in Pamlico County, North Carolina
Populated places established in 1997